Homotropic may refer to:

Homotropic allosteric modulation of enzymes
Homotropic modulation of the chemical synapse